The Northeast Coast Bantu languages are the Bantu languages spoken along the coast of Tanzania and Kenya, and including inland Tanzania as far as Dodoma. In Guthrie's geographic classification, they fall within Bantu zones G and E.

The languages, or clusters, are:
Pare-Taveta (G20+E70): 
Pareic
Pare, Mbugu 
Taveta
Sabaki (G40+E70): Swahili, Nyika, Comorian etc.
Seuta (G20+G30): Shambala, Bondei, Zigula (Mushungulu), Ngulu
Ruvu (G30+G10): Gogo, Sagara, Vidunda, Kaguru, Luguru, Kutu, Kami, Zaramo, Kwere, Doe
The Ruvu languages are 60–70% similar lexically.

Mbugu (Ma'a) is a mixed language based largely on Pare.

Notes

 
Languages of Kenya
Languages of Tanzania